Love Shine Through is the fourth studio album by British worship leader Tim Hughes. It was released in March 2011

Track listing

Personnel 
 Tim Hughes – lead vocals, lead guitar, acoustic guitar 
 Josiah Sherman – keyboards, programming 
 Ben Cantelon – additional keyboards 
 Martin Smith – keyboards, acoustic guitar, guest vocals (1)
 Nathan Nockels – keyboards, programming, electric guitar, backing vocals 
 Daniel Carson – electric guitar 
 Michael Guy Chislett – electric guitar 
 Marc James – slide guitar, pedal steel guitar, guest vocals (2)
 Mark Prentice – bass (1-11)
 Pat Malone – bass (12)
 Jerry Brown – drums (1-11), percussion (1-11)
 Ashley Appling – drums (12)
 Jamie Dalton – brass
 Rick Swann – brass
 Gerald La Feuvre – cello 
 Omotoye Makinde (Mo. Tru) – conductor 
 David Grant – backing vocals, guest vocals (11)
 Tony Momrelle – backing vocals 
 Fay Simpson – backing vocals, guest vocals (5)
 Kate Woodrow – backing vocals 
 Kim Walker-Smith – guest vocals (4)
 Rend Collective – crowd singing

References

External links
 Tim Hughes Official Website

2011 albums
Tim Hughes albums